Unter uns ("Between Us") is a German television soap opera, first broadcast on RTL on 28 November 1994. It is centered on the lives of the people in a residential house, which is set in the fictional 'Schillerallee' in Cologne. Since the show debuted, the baker's family Weigel is the series core family. Unter uns is not based on a foreign soap opera like Verbotene Liebe or Gute Zeiten, schlechte Zeiten. After Gute Zeiten, schlechte Zeiten, the show was the second daily soap for RTL, followed years later in 2006 by Alles was zählt. The show aired its 7,000th episode on 22 November 2022.

Cast

Current cast members

Past cast members 
A † indicates characters that have died.

Crossovers 
Over the years, Unter uns had three crossovers with other television shows.
 In 1997, the character of Rebecca Mattern (played by Imke Brügger) had several crossover appearances with the crime drama SK-Babies.
 On 25 October 2007, Unter uns started the first crossover of two German soaps. The characters of Nina Sommer (played by Nathalie Thiede), Tim Herzog (played by André Emanuel Kaminski) and Vanessa Steinkamp (played by Julia Augustin) from Alles was zählt crossed over and visited the beach bar Übersee. This was followed by a guest appearance of the character Mars (played by Marcel Saibert) on 5 November 2007 on Alles was zählt.
 In three episodes from 17 to 23 January 2008, Unter uns had a crossover with the scripted crime show Staatsanwalt Posch ermittelt. For that Christopher Posch made guest appearances to convince the character of Franziska Gellert (played by Olivia Klemke) to testify against her kidnapper Herrig.

References

External links

Unter uns spoiler 

German television soap operas
1994 German television series debuts
Television shows set in Cologne
2000s German television series
2010s German television series
German-language television shows
RTL (German TV channel) original programming